Concorès is a commune in the Lot department in south-western area of France.

Geography
The village lies on the right bank of the Céou, which flows northwestward through the commune.

See also
Communes of the Lot department

References

Communes of Lot (department)